Tehila may refer to:
Tehila (given name), a Hebrew feminine given name
Tehila (organization), an Israeli organization for parents of LGBT individuals

See also
Tehillah Magazine, Christian magazine aimed at an African-American audience